Mist of Chaos (ミスト オブ カオス, misuto obu kaosu) is a strategy role-playing game co-developed by Idea Factory and Neverland Co. for the PlayStation 3 video game console. It was released by Idea Factory in Japan on March 22, 2007 and distributed by Hong Kong-based New Era Interactive Software in South East Asia on March 23. Cyberfront Korea published a Korean version on July 31, 2007.

References

External links
Official website

2007 video games
PlayStation 3-only games
Tactical role-playing video games
Video games developed in Japan
PlayStation 3 games
Idea Factory games
Single-player video games
CyberFront games
Neverland (company) games